Walter Grealis OC (18 February 1929 – 20 January 2004) was a Canadian publisher and music industry leader. With partner Stan Klees, he co-founded Canada's national music honours, the Juno Awards. As an ardent supporter of Canadian music, Grealis is credited with coining the term CanCon.

History
Walt Grealis was born in Toronto and attended Central High School of Commerce in that city until Grade 10. His initial career was in law enforcement, first as a Royal Canadian Mounted Police officer then from 1952 as a Toronto city police officer.

Music career
He entered the music industry in 1960 after leaving policing and trying various careers in the late 1950s. He founded Canadian music industry magazine RPM in February 1964, publishing weekly for most of its existence until November 2000.

With partner Stan Klees, the Gold Leaf Awards were founded to honour Canadian music industry achievements. From 1964 to 1969, winners were announced in RPM at the end of each year. In 1970, this was expanded to a formal ceremonial event and renamed to Juno Awards later that year.

Honours
Grealis was appointed an Officer of the Order of Canada in 1993. In 1999, Grealis was inducted into the Canadian Country Music Hall of Fame. At the Juno Awards of 2004, he was posthumously honoured with the music industry achievement award named the Walt Grealis Special Achievement Award.

Later life
Grealis, a non-smoker, died at Klees' residence in 2004 following several years of lung cancer.

See also

 Music of Canada
 Juno Award
 RPM

Footnotes

Citations

References

External links
http://letsfixcancon.ca

1929 births
2004 deaths
Deaths from lung cancer
Officers of the Order of Canada
Toronto police officers
Royal Canadian Mounted Police officers
Canadian magazine publishers (people)
Canadian music industry executives
Juno Award winners
Deaths from cancer in Ontario
20th-century Canadian businesspeople
Businesspeople from Toronto